Clydebank East railway station served the town of Clydebank, West Dunbartonshire, Scotland, from 1882 to 1959 on the Glasgow, Yoker and Clydebank Railway.

History 
The station was opened on 1 December 1882 by the Glasgow, Yoker and Clydebank Railway. It was originally a terminus until  opened to the south on 17 May 1897, at which point the station's name changed to Clydebank East. It had carriage sidings on either side, goods sidings to the south, which served John Brown Ship Yard and Clydebank East Shed. The station closed on 14 September 1959.

References 

Disused railway stations in West Dunbartonshire
Railway stations in Great Britain opened in 1882
Railway stations in Great Britain closed in 1959
1882 establishments in Scotland
1959 disestablishments in Scotland